Ion Predescu (2 October 1927 – 12 October 2020) was a Romanian politician and judge who served as a Social Democratic Senator, Minister of Justice, and member of the Constitutional Court of Romania.

Predescu was born in Optași-Măgura, Olt County. He studied at the Radu Greceanu High School in Slatina and received his law degree from the University of Bucharest. He started practicing law in 1952, and taught at the Law Schools of the University of Craiova and  Spiru Haret University in Bucharest. In May 1990 he was elected to the Senate and in 1991 he participated in the drafting of the Constitution of Romania. He served as Minister of Justice from September 3 to December 12, 1996 in the Văcăroiu Cabinet. He was awarded the Order of the Star of Romania, Knight rank and the National Order of Faithful Service. He died in Craiova in 2020.

References

1927 births
2020 deaths
People from Olt County
Romanian Ministers of Justice
Members of the Senate of Romania
Constitutional Court of Romania judges
Social Democratic Party (Romania) politicians
University of Bucharest alumni
Knights of the Order of the Star of Romania
Recipients of the National Order of Faithful Service